Speak No Evil is a 2022 psychological horror thriller film directed by Christian Tafdrup from a screenplay he co-wrote with his brother . It is produced by Jacob Jarek and is distributed by Nordisk Film. Filming took place in Denmark, the Netherlands and Italy, and most of the film is shot in English, with some scenes in Danish and Dutch. The film centers on Bjørn (Morten Burian) and Louise (Sidsel Siem Koch), a Danish couple who are invited by Patrick (Fedja van Huêt) and Karin (Karina Smulders), a Dutch couple, to their country house for a weekend holiday; the hosts soon begin to test the limits of their guests as the situation escalates.

Speak No Evil premiered on 22 January 2022 at the 38th Sundance Film Festival. It was released theatrically in Denmark on 17 March 2022 and in the Netherlands on 21 July. The film won the "Best Director Choice" award at the 26th Bucheon International Fantastic Film Festival, and received generally positive reviews from critics, who praised the screenplay, direction and the performances.

Plot 
During their vacation in Tuscany, Bjørn and Louise, a Danish couple, and their daughter Agnes, meet Patrick and Karin, a Dutch couple, and their son Abel, who they claim suffers from congenital aglossia and was born without a tongue. A few weeks later, Bjørn and Louise receive an invitation from the Dutch couple to visit their remote rural house in the Netherlands, which they accept. After eight hours of driving, the family arrives at their destination. During the first two days, Louise feels uncomfortable about the hosts' passive-aggressive behaviors, such as Patrick's ignorance about her vegetarianism, his abusive behavior towards Abel, or Karin's swearing.

The hosts invite their guests out for dinner, but Louise is concerned because the children are not coming and have to stay with Abel's babysitter, Muhajid. Her concerns are exacerbated at the dinner when Patrick challenges her vegetarianism, and the couple drunkenly make out in front of them. After manipulating Bjørn into paying for the dinner, Patrick repeatedly plays loud music while driving under the influence, upsetting Louise. He enters the bathroom while she is taking a shower, and later observes the couple have sex. When Agnes' calls to sleep next to her parents are ignored, Patrick takes her into their bed. After Louise finds Agnes sleeping on the bed next to a naked Patrick, she wakes her husband and the family leaves, only to turn back shortly thereafter, after Agnes realizes that her rabbit doll Ninus is missing.

Back at the house, they are confronted about their sudden departure by the hosts, who now act enraged and disappointed. Bjørn fails to be blunt, so Louise briefly expresses the things that made her uncomfortable. Karin apologizes, but challenges her on why Agnes must sleep in their bed in the first place. They eventually convince their guests to stay. The women work in the yard, while the men buy groceries. On their way back, Bjørn and Patrick bond as the former attempts to explain how he often suppresses his emotions, compromising his true self. Patrick takes him to a beach where they practice screaming therapy. Later, when Louise cuts her finger in the kitchen, the couple discover that Patrick lied about being a doctor and is actually unemployed. After the dinner, the children perform a dance that they had practiced together; Patrick treats Abel abusively for his mistakes and throws a glass towards the wall, which results in Bjørn arguing with him.

That night, Bjørn discovers a cabin behind the house, and finds a collection of empty luggage and cameras inside. Amidst the collection, he also discovers numerous photographs on the wall depicting Patrick and Karin with other couples with young children on holidays, suggesting the Dutch couple's pattern of deceiving families in order to murder them, abduct their child, cut off the child's tongue, and use the "mute" child to repeat the cycle. Bjørn realizes that he and his family are the couple's next victims. On his way to collect his family, Bjørn finds Abel's body drowned in the pool. They successfully escape, but Bjørn does not tell his wife about his discovery.

After their car breaks down, Bjørn is forced to leave and search for help in the vicinity, but returns to find his family trapped inside Patrick's car. He obeys Patrick for the sake of his family's safety, remaining silent in the car. When Louise eventually becomes suspicious, she is ordered by Patrick, who now beats Bjørn into submission, to remain silent. As he stops the car, Muhajid arrives and holds down Louise while Karin cuts off Agnes' tongue; Muhajid leaves with Agnes, and her parents are taken further to a deserted road. Before the Danish couple are asked to get undressed, Bjørn asks them why they are doing this to them, to which Patrick calmly replies: "Because you let me." Bjørn and Louise are then asked to get into a ditch, where they are subsequently stoned to death. Some time later, a mute Agnes is forcibly playing the role of the Dutch couple's daughter, as the couple target another vacationing family for their next potential murder.

Cast

Production 
Speak No Evil is the third feature film by Christian Tafdrup, who is mostly active as an actor, and his first genre film, in which he tries to combine the drama genre with social commentary and psychological horror elements. He co-wrote the screenplay with his brother . Jacob Jarek acted as producer, with the production costs estimated to be €2.8 million. Filming had to be temporarily interrupted in Denmark and the Netherlands due to the COVID-19 pandemic. It was mostly filmed in English, and further shootings took place in the Netherlands and Italy.

The project was presented at the Nordic Film Market as part of the Gothenburg Film Festival before it was completed in January 2021 and was strongly courted by distributors. The film rights were subsequently sold to Australia and New Zealand, the Benelux countries, Russia and the Commonwealth of Independent States, and Hungary.

Release 
Speak No Evil received an invitation to the Midnight section of the 38th Sundance Film Festival, which included: "horror and comedy works that defy genre classification", where it premiered on 22 January 2022. The film was released theatrically in Denmark on March 17, 2022 by Nordisk Film and in the Netherlands on 21 July by September Film.

Reception

Box office 
, Speak No Evil has grossed $475,448 in Europe and $148,014 in Asia Pacific, for a worldwide total of $623,462.

Critical response 
  Sundance Film Festival touted the film as a "brilliantly provocative and simmering satirical work of horror [that] incriminates both sides".

Reviewing the film for IndieWire, Susannah Gruder praised the acting performances (specially Morten Burian's) and gave it a grade of "A" on an "A+" to "F" scale, and called it "the most cunningly depraved horror film in years [that offers] a piercing commentary on the ways we accommodate others to the point of self-subjugation". The New York Times critic Jeannette Catsoulis gave the film a score of 90/100, and while praising Tafdrup's direction called it "an icy satire of middle-class mores [that glides] inexorably from squirmy to sinister to full-on shocking [and] is utterly fearless in its mission to unsettle".

Accolades

References

External links 
 
 Speak No Evil on Mubi
 Speak No Evil at the 2022 Sundance Film Festival
 Speak No Evil on trustnordisk.com

2022 horror thriller films
2022 multilingual films
2022 psychological thriller films
2020s Danish-language films
2020s Dutch-language films
2020s English-language films
2020s psychological horror films
Danish horror films
Danish multilingual films
Danish thriller films
Dutch horror thriller films
Dutch multilingual films
English-language Danish films
English-language Dutch films
Films about families
Films set in Denmark
Films set in the Netherlands
Films set in Tuscany
Nordisk Film films